Preah Phos  is a khum (commune) of Koas Krala District in Battambang Province in north-western Cambodia.

Villages

 Sach Hab
 Boeng Preah
 Prey Phdau
 Kab Prich
 Ta Khao
 Koy Veaeng
 Prey Chak
 Ta Nuot
 Boeng Preah Kralanh

References

Communes of Battambang province
Koas Krala District